Ruben Nikolayevich Simonov ( (2 April 1899, Moscow, Russian Empire – 5 December 1968, Moscow, Soviet Union) was a Soviet and Russian actor, theater director and pedagogue. People's Artist of the USSR (1946).

Simonov was born in a family of Russian Armenians. Graduating from the Moscow State University, he then became an actor, starting his career at the Armenian drama studio in the Armenian House of Culture. In 1939 he became director of the Vakhtangov Theatre. He also led the Armenian and Uzbek theaters of Moscow.

Selected filmography
 Admiral Nakhimov (1947)
 The Fall of Berlin (1950)
The Gadfly (1955)

References

External links

Hollywood Upclose

Simonovs bio (in Russian)

1899 births
1968 deaths
Honored Artists of the RSFSR
People's Artists of the RSFSR
People's Artists of the USSR
Lenin Prize winners
Stalin Prize winners
Recipients of the Order of Lenin
Recipients of the Order of the Red Banner of Labour
Modernist theatre
Soviet theatre directors
Russian people of Armenian descent
Soviet male actors